The Exterminator is a 1980 American vigilante action film written and directed by James Glickenhaus. It stars Robert Ginty as Vietnam War veteran John Eastland, also known as "The Exterminator". When a group of thugs paralyze his friend, Eastland becomes a vigilante, embarking on a mission to cleanse New York of organized crime. The film also stars Samantha Eggar, Christopher George and Steve James. It has gained a cult following since its release.

Plot 

During a firefight in Vietnam, U.S. soldiers John Eastland and his best friend, Michael Jefferson, are captured by the Viet Cong. They are tied to wooden stakes with several other men, and tortured for information. When Eastland refuses to answer, the VC commander decapitates the soldier beside him with a machete. Jefferson escapes moments later, kills the remaining VC soldiers, and unties Eastland, who then kills the commander.

The film then shifts to New York, where Eastland and Jefferson work in a warehouse. One day, Eastland catches a group of thugs, called the Ghetto Ghouls, trying to steal beer. He is attacked, but Jefferson comes to his aid. They defeat them, but the gang return to cripple Jefferson, gouging his spine with a meat hook. Eastland, after this incident, captures and interrogates one of the gang members with a flamethrower. He then attacks the gang's base of operations with his rifle, shooting one gang member and leaving two others tied up in a basement (also shooting one of them afterwards), which is full of hungry rats.
 
Eastland's vigilante justice doesn't end there. The warehouse where he works has been forced into paying protection money. Gino Pontivini, the mob boss behind the scheme, has even taxed the workers' paychecks. Eastland kidnaps Pontivini, and chains him above an industrial meat grinder. Eastland then demands information to get to Pontivini's safe, which Pontivini reluctantly gives. Eastland barely survives an attack by Pontivini's Dobermann, so upon returning, he lowers Pontivini into the grinder for lying about the dog. Jefferson and his family are given Pontivini's money to help pay their bills.

Detective James Dalton begins investigating the attacks, while the press dub Eastland the "Exterminator". Meanwhile, Eastland kills the ring leader of a child prostitution ring, as well as a state senator from New Jersey who sexually abuses children. He also kills three more members of the Ghetto Ghouls (one of which being the gang member he interrogated earlier), after witnessing them rob an elderly woman. Meanwhile, the CIA has heard of the Exterminator and reaches an odd conclusion. Based on the current administration's promise to cut down crime rates, they believe the Exterminator is either an opposition party's stunt, or a foreign power's ruse to humiliate the current administration; by exposing their inability to handle the city's crime problem.

They monitor Dalton's investigation of the Exterminator. Dalton, working from a bootprint found at Pontivini's home, discovers the Exterminator wears hunting boots manufactured by a mail order firm in Maine. Asking them for a list of clients in New York, and following the hunch that the Exterminator may be a Vietnam War veteran; since he killed the Ghetto Ghouls with an M16 rifle, Dalton has narrowed his suspects accordingly. Eastland visits Jefferson in the hospital, and because he will never be able to walk again, Jefferson asks Eastland to kill him.

Eastland does, but coincidentally, Dalton is visiting the hospital at the same time. When he learns about Jefferson's death, Dalton surmises that one of Jefferson's friends was the Exterminator, and learns that one of his suspects, Eastland, was Jefferson's closest friend. Eastland is aware that Dalton is staking out his apartment, so he arranges a private meeting with him, where he hopes to explain why he became a vigilante. However, the CIA are aware of the rendezvous after bugging Eastland's phone. They ambush him at his meeting with Dalton, which results in Dalton being killed while helping Eastland escape.

Cast 

Samuel L. Jackson appears in an uncredited role as a movie extra.

Production 
For the scene of beheading, a dummy was used that was made by Stan Winston. Director James Glickenhaus believes the dummy was used in all shots, because it was so realistic.

Some scenes were shot at an illegal prostitution house on 42nd Street that had just been closed down by the police. Glickenhaus got permission to shoot there.

Release

Critical reception
On Rotten Tomatoes, the film has an approval rating of 38%, based on 13 reviews, with an average rating of 4/10.

At an advance screening, six months before the film's release, Roger Ebert, of the Chicago Sun-Times, criticized The Exterminator for being a "sick example of the almost unbelievable descent" that American movies had taken "into gruesome savagery". He called the film a "direct rip-off" of Death Wish (1974). After researching the Death Wish franchise, author Paul Talbot concluded that Death Wish "inspired" a number of "sadistic vigilante-themed movies"; The Exterminator being one of them. The New York Times, on the other hand, praised the acting, but felt the film was let down by the "screenplay and direction" of "beginner" James Glickenhaus; and by "lighting, camera work and sound that would rate an 'F' at film school".

Contemporary critics have been more appreciative. Eoin Friel, of the Action Elite, awarded three and a half stars out of five. Even though he found the opening scene quite "shocking", the acting a bit "ropey", and the effects "dated", he admitted the film "grabs you from the start". Den of Geek's Phil Beresford gave a mixed review. He stated that while Ginty is "not the greatest or most charismatic" of actors, "his essential ordinariness really works within the confines" of the film.

Controversy
Owing to its graphic violence, The Exterminator has been a controversial subject since its release. Dr. Sharon Packer and Jody Pennington spoke of this controversy and the film's "extreme justice" in their book A History of Evil in Popular Culture. They claimed the violence was a contributing factor to the film's "success", as the "audience loved it".

In an interview from 2012, writer-director James Glickenhaus explained his reasons for the graphic violence in the movie: "It was a time in which violence was on everybody’s mind, because of the war in Vietnam. And television and film had sanitized violence for a long time. Someone points a gun, it goes bang and on the other side of the street some guy goes ‘Aaaaah’ and falls down. But violence is really pretty unpleasant and I thought I had an obligation to portray it that way".

Sequel
A sequel, Exterminator 2, was released in 1984. Ginty and producer Mark Buntzman returned, with Buntzman serving as director as well. Glickenhaus explained his reasons for not doing the sequel in an interview: "I thought THE EXTERMINATOR told the story of the Exterminator. I didn’t see where you could go from there, other than make a sequel in which he goes around killing more bad guys".

The sequel was less successful. It grossed $3.7 million at the domestic box office, while its predecessor grossed $5 million in the same region.

A short movie called The Exterminator: Retribution by Rui Constantino was released in 2022.

References

Bibliography
 Packer, Sharon & Pennington, Jody (2014). A History of Evil In Popular Culture. United States: Praeger Publishing. .
 Scullion, Chris (2013). That Was A Bit Mental: Volume 1. United Kingdom: Self published (E-book). ISBN N/A.
 Talbot, Paul (2006). Bronson's Loose!: The Making of the Death Wish Films. United States: iUniverse. .

External links
 
 The Exterminator at The Numbers
 

1980 films
1980s vigilante films
1980s action thriller films
1980s crime thriller films
1980s crime action films
American action thriller films
American crime action films
American crime thriller films
American films about revenge
American vigilante films
Embassy Pictures films
Fictional portrayals of the New York City Police Department
Films about the New York City Police Department
Films about the Central Intelligence Agency
Films about child prostitution
Films about organized crime in the United States
Films about veterans
Films directed by James Glickenhaus
Films scored by Joe Renzetti
Films set in Manhattan
Films set in New York (state)
Films set in New York City
Films set in Vietnam
Vietnam War films
1980s English-language films
1980s American films